Ulrich Schmidl or Schmidel (1510 in Straubing - 1579 in Regensburg) was a German Landsknecht, conquistador, explorer, chronicler, and councilman. Schmidl was, beside Hans Staden, one of the few Landsknechts who wrote down their experiences of travel in the New World.

Biography
Schmidl was the son of a wealthy merchant, and received a good education. He entered military service and took part in 1534 as a Landsknecht under Pedro de Mendoza in an expedition to today's Argentina (the Río de la Plata). He also accompanied Juan de Ayolas on his first trip in quest of provisions, and afterward went with Ayolas in his expedition up the Paraguay River, and was one of the soldiers that were left with Domingo Irala in charge of the vessels in Puerto la Candelaria (modern Fuerte Olimpo). When Cabeza de Vaca was deposed in April 1544, Schmidel sustained Irala, who was the new governor, and in 1546 accompanied him in his expedition to Peru as far as the foot of the Andes, where he was despatched with Nuño de Chaves to President La Gasca. He accompanied Irala on his last unfortunate expedition of 1550.

He became a founder of Buenos Aires. His journey led him across the Río Paraná and Río Paraguay and into today's Paraguay, where he helped to found Asunción. From there he undertook several expeditions in the Gran Chaco, which led him into southeast Bolivia.

In 1552, on learning of the death of his elder brother to whose estate he was to succeed, Schmidl obtained his discharge. In Seville, he presented to the council of the Indies letters from Irala with the report of his discoveries, and arrived toward the close of 1554 in Straubing, where he afterward resided. He had kept a diary during his wanderings, and wrote a narrative of his adventures under the title of Wahre Geschichte einer merkwürdigen Reise, gemacht durch Ulrich Schmidel von Straubingen, in America oder der Neuen Welt, von 1534 bis 1554, wo man findet alle seine Leiden in 19 Jahren, und die Beschreibung der Länder und merkwürdigen Völker die er gesehen, von ihm selbst geschrieben (The true story of a noteworthy trip made by Ulrich Schmidel from Straubingen in America or the New World from 1534 to 1554, where will be found all his troubles of 19 years and the description of lands and noteworthy peoples he saw, described by himself; Frankfort, 1557), of which a Latin version appeared in Nuremberg in 1599 as Vera historia, etc. Henri Ternaux-Compans published a translation of the work in his Voyages, relations et mémoires originaux pour servir à l'histoire de la découverte de l'Amérique, recueil de documents sur la Floride (20 vol., 1837–1841) and Andrés González de Barcia in his Historiadores primitivos de Indias. Schmidel thus became the first historian of Argentina.

Much of his account in the German language overlaps with an account written in Spanish by Álvar Núñez Cabeza de Vaca, who was adelantado of the Governorate of the Río de la Plata between 1540 and 1545.  Their accounts, one by a German mercenary, another by a Spanish nobleman, offer stark differences in point of view.

His narrative gives the names and tells of the habits and manner of living of many Indigenous American nations that were extinct a century later. Perhaps the most fascinating parts of his accounts are those that attribute cannibalism not only to some South American tribes, but also to the desperate conquistadors who were unsuited for survival in the rough climate, and would consume one another in an effort to escape starvation. A particularly notable account states that Spaniards who were hung, were hacked up by their fellow countrymen, and devoured.

After his return to Straubing with a few pieces of booty, he inherited the fortune of his deceased brother, and became a councilman. Because of religious strife he had to leave Straubing and went in 1562 to Regensburg, where he died around 1579.

Notes

Sources

External links
 
 

1510 births
1579 deaths
Explorers of Argentina
History of Buenos Aires
German emigrants to Paraguay
German explorers
16th-century explorers
German conquistadors